The White Stripes were an American rock duo from Detroit formed in 1997. The group consisted of Jack White (songwriter, vocals, guitar, piano, and mandolin) and Meg White (drums and vocals). After releasing several singles and three albums within the Detroit music scene, the White Stripes rose to prominence in 2002 as part of the garage rock revival scene. Their successful and critically acclaimed albums White Blood Cells and Elephant drew attention from a large variety of media outlets in the United States and the United Kingdom. The single "Seven Nation Army", which used a guitar and an octave pedal to create the opening riff, became one of their most recognizable songs. The band recorded two more albums, Get Behind Me Satan in 2005 and Icky Thump in 2007, and dissolved in 2011 after a lengthy hiatus from performing and recording.

The White Stripes used a low-fidelity approach to writing and recording. Their music featured a melding of garage rock and blues influences and a raw simplicity of composition, arrangement, and performance. The duo were also noted for their fashion and design aesthetic which featured a simple color scheme of red, white, and black—which was used on every album and single cover they released—as well as the duo’s fascination with the number three. Their discography consists of six studio albums, two live albums, one extended play (EP), one concert film, one tour documentary, 26 singles, and 14 music videos. Their last three albums each won the Grammy Award for Best Alternative Music Album. In 2015, Rolling Stone named them the sixth greatest duo of all time.

History

Early history
In high school, Jack Gillis (as he was then known) met Meg White at the Memphis Smoke—the restaurant where she worked and where he would read his poetry at open mic nights. The two became friends, and began to frequent the coffee shops, local music venues, and record stores of the area.  By this time, Gillis was already playing drums with musician friends, including his upholstery apprenticeship mentor, Brian Muldoon. In 1994, he got his first professional job as the drummer for the Detroit cowpunk band Goober & the Peas.

After dating for several years, Gillis and White married on September 21, 1996. Contrary to convention, he took his wife's surname. Shortly after, Goober and the Peas broke up, but Jack continued to play in other bands, such as the garage punk band the Go (he played lead guitar on their 1999 album Whatcha Doin'), the Hentchmen, and Two-Star Tabernacle. On Bastille Day 1997, Meg started learning to play the drums. In Jack's words, "When she started to play drums with me, just on a lark, it felt liberating and refreshing. There was something in it that opened me up." The couple then became a band and, while they considered calling themselves Bazooka and Soda Powder, they settled on the White Stripes. Jack explained the name's origin:
Meg loves peppermints, and we were going to call ourselves the Peppermints. But since our last name was White, we decided to call it the White Stripes. It revolved around this childish idea, the ideas kids have—because they are so much better than adult ideas, right?"
From the beginning, they established certain motifs: publicly pretending to be brother and sister, outfitting their production in only black, red, and white, and heavily using the number "three". White has explained that they used these colors to distract from the fact that they were young, white musicians playing "black music". They were also noted for their lack of a bass player, and their general refusal to be interviewed separately.

The White Stripes had their first live performance on August 14, 1997, at the Gold Dollar bar in Detroit. They began their career as part of the Michigan underground garage rock scene, playing with local bands such as the Hentchmen, the Dirtbombs, the Gories, and Rocket 455. In 1998, Dave Buick—owner of an independent, Detroit-based, garage-punk label called Italy Records—approached the band at a bar and asked if they would like to record a single. Jack initially declined, believing it would be too expensive, but he eventually reconsidered when he realized that Buick was offering to pay for it. Their debut single, "Let's Shake Hands", was released on vinyl in February 1998 with an initial pressing of 1,000 copies. This was followed in October 1998 by the single "Lafayette Blues" which, again, was only released on vinyl with  copies.

The White Stripes (1999)

In 1999, the White Stripes signed with the California-based label Sympathy for the Record Industry. In March 1999, they released the single "The Big Three Killed My Baby", followed by their debut album, The White Stripes, on June 15, 1999. The self-titled debut was produced by Jack and engineered by American music producer Jim Diamond at his Ghetto Recorders studio in Detroit. The album was dedicated to the seminal Mississippi Delta blues musician Son House, an artist who influenced Jack. The track "Cannon" from The White Stripes contains part of an a cappella version, as performed by House, of the traditional American gospel blues song "John the Revelator". The White Stripes also covered House's song "Death Letter" on their follow-up album De Stijl. Looking back on their debut during a 2003 interview with Guitar Player, Jack said, "I still feel we've never topped our first album. It's the most raw, the most powerful, and the most Detroit-sounding record we've made."

Allmusic said of the album:

At the end of 1999, the White Stripes released "Hand Springs" as a 7" split single with fellow Detroit band the Dirtbombs on the B-side. 2,000 copies came free with the pinball fanzine Multiball. The record is currently—like the majority of vinyl records by the White Stripes—out of print and difficult to find.

De Stijl (2000)

Jack and Meg divorced in March 2000. The White Stripes were scheduled to perform at a local music lounge soon after they separated. Jack assumed the band was over and asked Buick and nephew Ben Blackwell to perform with him in the slot that had been booked for the White Stripes. However, the day they were supposed to perform, Meg convinced Jack that the White Stripes should continue and the band reunited. The White Stripes' second album, De Stijl (Dutch for "The Style"), was released on the Sympathy for the Record Industry label on June 20, 2000. Considered a cult classic and self-recorded on an 8-track analog tape in Jack's living room, De Stijl displays the simplicity of the band's blues and "scuzzy garage rock" fusion prior to their breakthrough success.

The album title derives from the Dutch art movement of the same name; common elements of the De Stijl aesthetic are demonstrated on the album cover, which sets the band members against an abstract background of rectangles and lines in red, black and white. The White Stripes cited the minimalist and deconstructionist aspects of De Stijl design as a source of inspiration for their own musical image and presentation. The album was dedicated to furniture designer and architect Gerrit Rietveld of the De Stijl movement, as well as to the influential Georgia bluesman Blind Willie McTell.

Party of Special Things to Do was released as a 7" on Sub Pop in December 2000. It comprised three songs originally performed by Captain Beefheart, an experimental blues rock musician. 

De Stijl eventually reached number 38 on Billboard Magazines Independent Albums chart in 2002, around the time the White Stripes' popularity began establishing itself. One New York Times critic at the time said that the Stripes typified "what many hip rock fans consider real music." The song "Why Can't You Be Nicer to Me?" was used in The Simpsons episode "Judge Me Tender".

On October 2, 2005, Jim Diamond—the owner and operator of Ghetto Recorders recording studio—filed a lawsuit against the band and Third Man Records for "breach of contract". In the suit, he claimed that as the co-producer, mixer, and editor on the band's debut album, and mixer and engineer on De Stijl, he was due royalties for "mechanical rights".Harris, Chris (June 16, 2006), "White Stripes Win Royalties Lawsuit". MTV. Retrieved March 16, 2015. The band filed a counterclaim on May 16 of that year, requesting damages against Diamond and an official court declaration denying him rights to the material. Diamond lost the suit, with the jury determining that he was not instrumental in crafting the band's sound.

Dominique Payette, a Quebecois radio host, sued the band for $70,000 in 2008 for sampling 10 seconds of her radio show in the song "Jumble Jumble" without permission. The matter was ultimately settled out of court.

White Blood Cells (2001)

The White Stripes' third album, White Blood Cells, was released on July 3, 2001, on Sympathy for the Record Industry. The band enjoyed its first significant success the following year with the major label re-release of the album on V2 Records. Its stripped-down garage rock sound drew critical acclaim in the UK, and in the US soon afterward, making the White Stripes one of the most acclaimed bands of 2002.

Several outlets praised their "back to basics" approach, with Daily Mirror calling them "the greatest band since The Sex Pistols." In 2002, Q magazine listed the White Stripes as one of "50 Bands to See Before You Die". After their first appearance on network TV (a live set on The Late Late Show With Craig Kilborn), Joe Hagan of The New York Times declared, "They have made rock rock again by returning to its origins as a simple, primitive sound full of unfettered zeal." White Blood Cells peaked at number 61 on the Billboard 200, reaching Gold record status by selling over 500,000 albums. It reached number 55 in the United Kingdom, being bolstered in both countries by the single "Fell in Love with a Girl" and its accompanying Lego-animation music video directed by Michel Gondry. The video won three awards at the 2002 MTV Video Music Awards: Breakthrough Video, Best Special Effects, and Best Editing, and the band played the song live at the event. It was also nominated for Video of the Year, but fell short of winning. Stylus Magazine rated White Blood Cells as the fourteenth greatest album of 2000–2005, while Pitchfork Media ranked it eighth on their list of the top 100 albums from 2000 to 2004.

In 2002, George Roca produced and directed a concert film about the band titled Nobody Knows How to Talk to Children. It chronicles the White Stripes' four-night stand at New York City's Bowery Ballroom in 2002, and contains live performances and behind-the-scenes footage. Its 2004 release was suppressed by the band's management, however, after they discovered that Roca had been showing it at the Seattle Film Festival without permission. According to the band, the film was "not up to the standards our fans have come to expect"; even so, it remains a highly prized bootleg.

Elephant (2003)

The White Stripes' fourth album, Elephant, was recorded in 2002 over the span of two weeks with British recording engineer Liam Watson at his Toe Rag Studios in London. Jack self-produced the album with antiquated equipment, including a duct-taped 8-track tape machine and pre-1960s recording gear. It was released in 2003 on V2 in the US, and on XL Recordings in England. It marked the band's major label debut and was their first UK chart-topping album, as well as their first US Top 10 album (at number six). The album eventually reached double platinum certification in Britain, and platinum certification in the United States.

Elephant garnered critical acclaim upon its release. It received a perfect five-out-of-five-star rating from Rolling Stone magazine, and enjoys a 92-percent positive rating on Metacritic. Allmusic said the album "sounds even more pissed-off, paranoid, and stunning than its predecessor... Darker and more difficult than White Blood Cells." Elephant was notable for Jack's first guitar solos, and Rolling Stone placed him at number 17 on its list of "100 Greatest Guitarists of All Time". That same year, Elephant was ranked number 390 on the magazine's list of the 500 Greatest Albums of All Time. In 2009, the album came in at number 18 in NME's "Top 100 Greatest Albums of the decade". NME referred to the album as the pinnacle of the White Stripes' time as a band and one of Jack White's best works of his career.

The album's first single, "Seven Nation Army", was the band's most successful and topped the Billboard rock charts. Its success was followed with a cover of Burt Bacharach's "I Just Don't Know What to Do with Myself". The album's third single was the successful "The Hardest Button to Button". "There's No Home for You Here" was the fourth single. In 2004, the album won a Grammy for Best Alternative Music Album, while "Seven Nation Army" won a Grammy for Best Rock Song.

Get Behind Me Satan (2005)

In 2005, Jack began working on songs for the band's next album at his home. He played with different techniques than in past albums, trading in his electric guitar for an acoustic on all but a few of the tracks, as his trademark riff-based lead guitar style is overtaken by a predominantly rhythmic approach. The White Stripes' fifth album, Get Behind Me Satan, was released in 2005 on the V2 label. The title is an allusion to a Biblical quotation Jesus made to the Apostle Simon Peter from the Gospel of Matthew 16:23 of the New Testament (in the King James Version, the quotation is slightly different: "Get thee behind me, Satan"). Another theory about this title is that Jack and Meg White read James Joyce's story collection "Dubliners" (published 1914) and used a line from the final story "The Dead" to title this album.  The title is also a direct quotation from Who bassist John Entwistle’s solo song "You’re Mine".

With its reliance on piano-driven melodies and experimentation with marimba on "The Nurse" and "Forever For Her (Is Over For Me)", Get Behind Me Satan did not feature the explicit blues and punk styles that dominated earlier White Stripes albums. However, despite this, the band was critically lauded for their "fresh, arty reinterpretations of their classic inspirations." It has garnered positive reactions from fans, as well as critical acclaim, receiving more Grammy nominations as well as making them one of the must-see acts of the decade. Rolling Stone ranked it the third best album of the year and it received the Grammy for Best Alternative Music Album in 2006.

Three singles were released from the album, the first being "Blue Orchid", a popular song on satellite radio and some FM stations. The second and third singles were "My Doorbell" and "The Denial Twist", respectively, and music videos were made for the three singles. "My Doorbell" was nominated for Best Pop Performance by a Duo or Group with Vocal.

The White Stripes postponed the Japanese leg of their world tour after Jack strained his vocal cords, with doctors recommending that Jack not sing or talk for two weeks. After a full recovery, he returned to the stage in Auckland, New Zealand to headline the Big Day Out tour. While on the British leg of the tour, Jack changed his name from Jack White to "Three quid".

The White Stripes released a cover version of Tegan and Sara's song "Walking with a Ghost" on iTunes in November 2005. The song was later released in December as the Walking with a Ghost EP featuring four other live tracks. In October 2006, it was announced on the official White Stripes website that there would be an album of avant-garde orchestral recordings consisting of past music written by Jack called Aluminium. The album was made available for pre-order on November 6, 2006, to great demand from the band's fans; the LP version of the project sold out in a little under a day. The project was conceived by Richard Russell, founder of XL Recordings, who co-produced the album with Joby Talbot. It was recorded between August 2005 and February 2006 at Intimate Studios in Wapping, London using an orchestra. Before the album went out of print, it was available exclusively through the Aluminium website in a numbered limited edition of 3,333 CDs with 999 LPs.

On January 12, 2007, V2 Records announced that, due to being under the process of reconstruction, it would no longer release new White Stripes material, leaving the band without a label. However, as the band's contract with V2 had already expired, on February 12, 2007, it was confirmed that the band had signed a single album deal with Warner Bros. Records.

Icky Thump (2007)

The White Stripes' sixth album, Icky Thump, was released on June 19, 2007, on Warner Bros. Records. This was their first record with Warner Bros., since V2 closed in 2006, and it was released on a one-album contract. Icky Thump entered the UK Albums Chart at number one, and debuted at number two on the Billboard 200 with 223,000 copies sold. By late July, Icky Thump was certified gold in the United States. As of March 8, 2008, the album has sold 725,125 copies in the US. On February 10, 2008, the album won a Grammy Award for Best Alternative Music Album.

Following the well-received Get Behind Me Satan, Icky Thump marked a return to the punk, garage rock and blues influences for which the band is known. It was recorded at Nashville's Blackbird Studio and took almost three weeks to record—the longest of any White Stripes album. It would also be their first album with a title track. The album's release came on the heels of a series of concerts in Europe and one in North America at Bonnaroo.News page, The White Stripes website show list . Retrieved April 13, 2007.

Prior to the album's release, three tracks were previewed to NME: "Icky Thump", "You Don't Know What Love Is (You Just Do as You're Told)" and "Conquest". NME described the tracks as "an experimental, heavy sounding 70s riff", "a strong, melodic love song" and "an unexpected mix of big guitars and a bold horn section", respectively. On the US Billboard Charts dated May 12, 2007, "Icky Thump"—the first single—became the band's first Top 40 single, charting at number 26, and later charted at number 2 in the UK.

On April 25, 2007, the duo announced that they would embark on a tour of Canada, performing in all 10 provinces, plus Yukon, Nunavut and Northwest Territories. In the words of Jack: "Having never done a tour of Canada, Meg and I thought it was high time to go whole hog. We want to take this tour to the far reaches of the Canadian landscape. From the ocean to the permafrost. The best way for us to do that is ensure that we perform in every province and territory in the country, from the Yukon to Prince Edward Island. Another special moment of this tour is the show which will occur in Glace Bay, Nova Scotia on July 14, the White Stripes' Tenth Anniversary." Canadian fiddler Ashley MacIsaac opened for the band at the Glace Bay show; earlier in 2007, MacIsaac and Jack had discovered that they were distantly related. It was also at this time that White learned he was related to Canadian fiddle player Natalie MacMaster.

On June 24, 2007, just a few hours before their concert at Deer Lake Park, the White Stripes began their cross-Canada tour by playing a 40-minute set for a group of 30 kids at the Creekside Youth Centre in Burnaby. The Canadian tour was also marked by concerts in small markets, such as Glace Bay, Whitehorse and Iqaluit, as well as by frequent "secret shows" publicized mainly by posts on The Little Room, a White Stripes fan messageboard. Gigs included performances at a bowling alley in Saskatoon, a youth center in Edmonton, a Winnipeg Transit bus and The Forks park in Winnipeg, a park in Whitehorse, the YMCA in downtown Toronto, the Arva Flour Mill in Arva, Ontario, Locas on Salter (a pool hall) in Halifax, Nova Scotia, and a famous one-note show on George Street in St. John's, Newfoundland. They played a full show later that night at the Mile One Centre in downtown St. John's. Video clips from several of the secret shows have been posted to YouTube. As well, the band filmed its video for "You Don't Know What Love Is (You Just Do as You're Told)" in Iqaluit.

After the conclusion of the Canadian dates, they embarked on a brief U.S. leg of their tour, which was to be followed by a break before more shows in the fall. But before their last show—in Southaven, Mississippi—Ben Blackwell (Jack's nephew and the group's archivist) says that Meg approached him and said, "This is the last White Stripes show". He asked if she meant of the tour, but she responded, "No. I think this is the last show, period." On September 11, 2007, the band announced the cancellation of 18 tour dates due to Meg's struggle with acute anxiety. A few days later, the duo canceled the remainder of their 2007 UK tour dates as well.

Later work and breakup (2008–2011)
The band was on hiatus from late 2007 to early 2011. While on hiatus, Jack formed a group called The Dead Weather (featuring himself, Jack Lawrence, Dean Fertita, and Alison Mosshart), although he insisted that the White Stripes remained his top priority. The White Stripes performed live for the first time since September 2007 on the final episode of Late Night with Conan O'Brien on February 20, 2009, where they performed an alternate version of "We're Going to Be Friends". This proved to be their final live performance as a band.

In 2009 he reported that the White Stripes were working on their seventh album. In an article dated May 6, 2009, with MusicRadar.com, Jack mentioned recording songs with Meg before the Conan gig had taken place, saying, "We had recorded a couple of songs at the new studio." About a new White Stripes album, Jack said, "It won't be too far off. Maybe next year." Jack also explained Meg's acute anxiety during the Stripes' last tour, saying, "I just came from a Raconteurs tour and went right into that, so I was already full-speed. Meg had come from a dead-halt for a year and went right back into that madness. Meg is a very shy girl, a very quiet and shy person. To go full-speed from a dead-halt is overwhelming, and we had to take a break."

A concert film, Under Great White Northern Lights, premiered at the Toronto International Film Festival on September 18, 2009. The film (directed by Emmett Malloy) documents the band's summer 2007 tour across Canada and contains live concert and off-stage footage. Jack and Meg White appeared at the premiere and made a short speech before the movie started about their love of Canada and why they chose to debut their movie in Toronto. The tour was in support of the album Icky Thump, and they performed in every province. Jack conceived the idea of touring Canada after learning that Scottish relatives on his father's side had lived for a few generations in Nova Scotia before relocating to Detroit to work in the car factories. Additionally, their 10th anniversary occurred during the tour on the day of their show in Glace Bay, Nova Scotia, and in this shot, Jack and Meg are dancing at the conclusion of the concert. The film was directed by a friend of the duo, Emmett Malloy. A second feature, Under Nova Scotian Lights, was prepared for the DVD release.

In an interview with Self Titled, Jack alluded to the creation of a White Stripes film to be released later in 2009. In an interview with contactmusic.com, Jack claimed that working with the White Stripes would be "strange". "It would definitely be strange to go into the White Stripes again and have to rethink my game," adding: "But that would be the best thing about it, because it would be a whole new White Stripes."

In 2010, a Super Bowl ad by the U.S. Air Force Reserve caused the White Stripes to "take strong insult and objection to the Air Force Reserve presenting this advertisement with the implication that we licensed one of our songs to encourage recruitment during a war that we do not support."

In November 2010, the White Stripes contributed a previously released cover version of the song "Rated X" to the compilation album Coal Miner's Daughter: A Tribute To Loretta Lynn. In late 2010, the White Stripes reissued their first three albums on Third Man Records on a 180-gram vinyl along with 500 limited-edition, "split-colored" records to accompany it. Jack hinted at a possible White Stripes reunion in a 2010 interview with Vanity Fair. He said, "We thought we'd do a lot of things that we'd never done: a full tour of Canada, a documentary, coffee-table book, live album, a boxed set... Now that we've gotten a lot of that out of our system, Meg and I can get back in the studio and start fresh."

On February 2, 2011, the duo announced that they had officially ceased recording and performing music as the White Stripes. The announcement specifically denied any artistic differences or health issues, but cited "a myriad of reasons ... mostly to preserve what is beautiful and special about the band".

In a 2014 interview, Jack said that Meg's lack of enthusiasm for the project contributed to the band's breakup. White told Rolling Stone that "she viewed me that way of 'Oh, big deal, you did it, so what?' Almost every single moment of the White Stripes was like that. We'd be working in the studio and something amazing would happen: I'm like, 'Damn, we just broke into a new world right there!' And Meg's sitting in silence."

Artistry

Musical style
The White Stripes have been described as garage rock, blues rock, alternative rock, punk blues, and indie rock. They emerged from Detroit's active garage rock revival scene of the late 1990s and early 2000s. Their contemporaries included bands such as The Von Bondies, The Dirtbombs, The Detroit Cobras, and other bands that Jack included on a compilation album called Sympathetic Sounds of Detroit, which was recorded in his living room.

The band was influenced by blues musicians including Son House, Blind Willie McTell and Robert Johnson, garage rock bands such as The Gories and The Sonics, the Detroit protopunk sound of bands like the MC5 and The Stooges, in addition to groups like The Cramps, The Velvet Underground, and the early Los Angeles punk blues band The Gun Club. Jack has stated on numerous occasions that the blues is the dominant influence on his songwriting and the roots of the band's music, stating that he feels it is so sacred that playing it does not do it justice. Of The Gun Club's music in particular, Jack said, "'Sex Beat', 'She's Like Heroin To Me', and 'For The Love Of Ivy'...why are these songs not taught in schools?" Heavy blues rock bands such as AC/DC and Led Zeppelin have also influenced the band, as Jack has claimed that he "can't trust anybody who doesn't like Led Zeppelin."

Traditional country music such as Hank Williams and Loretta Lynn, rockabilly acts like the Flat Duo Jets, Wanda Jackson and Gene Vincent, the surf rock of Dick Dale, and folk music like Lead Belly and Bob Dylan have also influenced the band's sound. Meg has said one of her all-time favorite musicians is Bob Dylan; Jack has performed live with him, and has claimed "I've got three fathers—my biological dad, God and Bob Dylan".

Instruments and equipment

The White Stripes were notable for having only two musicians, limiting the instruments they could play live. Jack, the principal writer, said that this was not a problem, and that he "always centered the band around the number three. Everything was vocals, guitar and drums or vocals, piano and drums." Fans and critics drew comparisons between Jack's prowess on the guitar and Meg's simplistic, reserved drumming. The band additionally drew attention for their preference for antiquated recording equipment. In a 2001 New York Times concert reviews, Ann Powers noted that Jack's "ingenious" playing was "constrained by [Meg's] deliberately undeveloped approach", and that "he created more challenges by playing an acoustic guitar with paper taped over the hole and a less-than-high-quality solid body electric."

With few exceptions, Jack displayed a continued partiality towards amps and pedals from the 1960s. Jack used a number of effects to create his sound, such as a DigiTech Whammy IV to reach pitches that would be otherwise impossible with a regular guitar. When performing live, Jack used a Randy Parsons custom guitar, a 1964 JB Hutto Montgomery Airline, a Harmony Rocket, a 1970s Crestwood Astral II, and a 1950s Kay Hollowbody. Also, while playing live, he used an MXR Micro-Amp, Electro-Harmonix Big Muff Pi distortion/sustainer, and an Electro-Harmonix POG (a polyphonic octave generator). He also used a Boss TU-2 tuner pedal. He plugged this setup into a 1970s Fender Twin Reverb, and two 100-Watt Sears Silvertone 1485 amplifiers paired with two 6x10 Silvertone cabinets. In addition to standard guitar tuning, Jack also used several open tunings. He also played other instruments such as a black F-Style Gibson mandolin, Rhodes bass keys, and a Steinway piano. He played a custom-made red and white marimba on "The Nurse", "Forever for Her (Is Over for Me)" as well as on the non-album tracks "Who's A Big Baby" and "Top Special".

Meg's minimalistic drumming style was a prominent part of the band's sound. Meg never had formal drum lessons. She played Ludwig Drums with Paiste cymbals, and says her pre-show warm-up consisted of "whiskey and Red Bull." Jack downplayed criticisms of her style, insisting: "I never thought 'God, I wish Neil Peart was in this band.' It's kind of funny: When people critique hip hop, they're scared to open up, for fear of being called racist. But they're not scared to open up on female musicians, out of pure sexism. Meg is the best part of this band. It never would have worked with anybody else, because it would have been too complicated... It was my doorway to playing the blues." 

Of her playing style, Meg herself said: "I appreciate other kinds of drummers who play differently, but it's not my style or what works for this band. I get [criticism] sometimes, and I go through periods where it really bothers me. But then I think about it, and I realize that this is what is really needed for this band. And I just try to have as much fun with it as possible ... I just know the way [Jack] plays so well at this point that I always know kind of what he's going to do. I can always sense where he's going with things just by the mood he's in or the attitude or how the song is going. Once in a while, he throws me for a loop, but I can usually keep him where I want him."

Although Jack was the lead vocalist, Meg did sing lead vocals on four of the band's songs: "In the Cold, Cold Night" (from Elephant), "Passive Manipulation" (from Get Behind Me Satan), "Who's a Big Baby?" (released on the "Blue Orchid" single), and "St. Andrew (This Battle Is in the Air)" (from Icky Thump). She also accompanied Jack on the songs "Your Southern Can Is Mine" from their album De Stijl, "Hotel Yorba" and "This Protector" from their album White Blood Cells, on "You Don't Know What Love Is (You Just Do as You're Told)" and "Rag & Bone" from their album Icky Thump, "Rated X" and also sang alongside Jack and Holly Golightly on the song "It's True That We Love One Another", from the album Elephant.

Recording sessions and live performances

Several White Stripes recordings were completed rapidly. White Blood Cells was recorded in less than 4 days, and Elephant was recorded in about two weeks in London's Toe Rag Studio. Their 2005 follow-up, Get Behind Me Satan, was likewise recorded in just two weeks. For live shows, the White Stripes were known for Jack's employment of heavy distortion, as well as audio feedback and overdrive. The duo performed considerably more recklessly and unstructured live, never preparing set lists for their shows, believing that planning too closely would ruin the spontaneity of their performances.

 Image 

Aesthetics and presentation
The White Stripes had a carefully constructed image built around lore they created for themselves and visual motifs. Early in their history, they turned down a potential deal with Chicago label Bobsled, because the label wanted to put its green logo on the CD. Their presentation was a subject of intrigue among the public and in the media.

Early in their career, the band provided various descriptions of their relationship. Jack claimed that he and Meg were siblings, the youngest two of ten. As the story went, they became a band when, on Bastille Day 1997, Meg went to the attic of their parents' home and began to play on Jack's drum kit. This claim was widely believed and repeated despite rumors that they were, or had been, husband and wife."The White Stripes: Raw Rock Revivalists"  BBC News UK, August 10, 2001, Retrieved April 26, 2008 In 2001, proof of their 1996 marriage emerged, as well as evidence that the couple had divorced in March 2000, just before the band gained widespread attention. Even so, they continued to insist publicly that they were brother and sister. In a 2005 interview with Rolling Stone magazine, Jack claimed that this open secret was intended to keep the focus on the music rather than the couple's relationship:
When you see a band that is two pieces, husband and wife, boyfriend and girlfriend, you think, 'Oh, I see...' When they're brother and sister, you go, 'Oh, that's interesting.' You care more about the music, not the relationship—whether they're trying to save their relationship by being in a band.

The White Stripes made exclusive use of a red, white and black color scheme when conducting virtually all professional duties, from album art to the clothes worn during live performances; Meg said that "like a uniform at school, you can just focus on what you're doing because everybody's wearing the same thing." Jack also explained that they aspired to invoke an innocent childishness without any intention of irony or humor. Spin magazine commented that "his songs—about getting married in cathedrals, walking to kindergarten, and guileless companionship—are performed with an almost naive certitude." Other affectations included Jack using two microphones onstage.

The media and fans alike varied between intrigue and skepticism at the band's appearance and presentation. Andy Gershon, president of the V2 label at the time of their signing, was reluctant to sign them, saying, "They need a bass player, they've got this red-and-white gimmick, and the songs are fantastic, but they've recorded very raw...how is this going to be on radio?" In a 2002 Spin magazine article, Chuck Klosterman wondered, "how can two media-savvy kids posing as brother and sister, wearing Dr. Seuss clothes, represent blood-and-bones Detroit, a city whose greatest resource is asphalt?" However, in 2001, Benjamin Nugent with TIME magazine commented that "it's hard to begrudge [Jack] his right to nudge the spotlight toward his band, and away from his private life, by any means available. Even at the expense of the truth."

 Other activities 
Jack and Meg White appeared in Jim Jarmusch's film Coffee and Cigarettes in 2003, in a segment entitled "Jack Shows Meg His Tesla Coil". This particular segment contains extensions of White Stripes motifs such as childhood innocence and Nikola Tesla. In 2004, the band released its first music film Under Blackpool Lights, which was shot entirely on super 8 film and was directed by Dick Carruthers. The band also appeared as themselves in The Simpsons episode "Jazzy and the Pussycats" in 2006. Jack is one of three guitarists featured in the 2009 documentary It Might Get Loud, and Meg appears in segments that include the White Stripes.

 Legacy 

 Achievements and accolades 

The White Stripes received several awards throughout their career. Their final three albums, Elephant, Get Behind Me Satan and Icky Thump, each won the Grammy Award for Best Alternative Music Album; they were also awarded Best Rock Song for "Seven Nation Army", Best Rock Performance by a Duo or Group with Vocal for "Icky Thump", and Best Boxed or Special Limited Edition Package for Under Great White Northern Lights. White Blood Cells and Elephant both appeared on Rolling Stone's list of the "500 Greatest Albums of All Time". In 2015, Rolling Stone named the White Stripes the sixth greatest duo of all time. 

Ballet production
In 2007, British choreographer Wayne McGregor used music by the White Stripes for his production Chroma, a piece he created for The Royal Ballet in London, England. The orchestral arrangements for Chroma were commissioned by Richard Russell, head of XL Recordings, as a gift to the White Stripes and were produced by the British classical composer Joby Talbot. Three of these songs, "The Hardest Button to Button", "Aluminium" and "Blue Orchid", were first played to the band as a surprise in Cincinnati Music Hall, Ohio. McGregor heard the orchestral versions and decided to create a ballet using the music. Talbot re-orchestrated the music for the Royal Opera House orchestra, also writing three additional pieces of his own composition. The world premiere of the ballet took place on November 16, 2006, at the Royal Opera House in Covent Garden, London. The ballet subsequently won the 2007 Laurence Olivier Award for Best New Dance Production.

 Film and television 
The Academy Award-winning 2010 movie, The Social Network featured "Ball and Biscuit" in the opening scene. The song "Little Ghost" appears in the post credits scene for the 2012 Laika studios film, ParaNorman. In 2013, several songs by the White Stripes were featured in the first season of the television series Peaky Blinders. The song "Apple Blossom" was featured in the 2015 Quentin Tarantino film The Hateful Eight. The song "I Just Don't Know What to Do with Myself" was featured in a 2023 advertising campaign for Calvin Klein.

Members
 Jack White – vocals, guitars, keyboards, piano, bass, percussion
 Meg White – drums, percussion, vocals

DiscographyStudio albums'''
 The White Stripes (1999)
 De Stijl (2000)
 White Blood Cells (2001)
 Elephant (2003)
 Get Behind Me Satan (2005)
 Icky Thump (2007)

See also
Music of Detroit

References

Works cited

Further reading
Sullivan, Denise (2004). The White Stripes: Sweethearts of the Blues.'' Backbeat Books.

External links

 
1997 establishments in Michigan
2011 disestablishments in Michigan
American blues rock musical groups
American musical duos
Brit Award winners
Garage rock groups from Michigan
Grammy Award winners
Indie rock musical groups from Michigan
MTV Europe Music Award winners
Male–female musical duos
Married couples
Musical groups disestablished in 2011
Musical groups established in 1997
Musical groups from Detroit
Punk blues musical groups
Rock music duos
Sub Pop artists
Sympathy for the Record Industry artists
Third Man Records artists
V2 Records artists
Warner Records artists
Alternative rock groups from Michigan